The Donald T. Campbell Award is an award given annually by the Society for Personality and Social Psychology, division 8 of the American Psychological Association, since 1980. It is given to honor distinguished researchers in the field of social psychology. It is named after the highly regarded social scientist and social psychologist Donald T. Campbell.

Recipients
Source: SPSP
1980: Elliot Aronson
1982: Richard Nesbitt
1984: Ellen Berscheid
1986: Bibb Latane
1988: Robert Rosenthal
1990: Bernard Weiner
1992: Marilynn Brewer
1993: Alice Eagly
1994: Anthony Greenwald
1995: Shelley Taylor
1996: E. Tory Higgins
1997: Mark Zanna
1998: Arie Kruglanski
1999: Abraham Tesser
2000: Richard E. Petty, John Cacioppo
2001: Claude Steele
2002: Hazel Markus
2003: Robert Cialdini
2004: Mark Snyder
2005: David Kenny
2006: John A. Bargh
2007: Michael Scheier, Charles S. Carver
2008: Carol Dweck
2009: Susan T. Fiske
2010: Russ Fazio
2011: John Dovidio
2012: Daniel Wegner
2013: Timothy Wilson
2014: Norbert Schwarz
2015: Brenda Major and Jennifer Crocker
2016: Mahzarin R. Banaji
2017: Daniel Gilbert
2018: Eliot R. Smith
2019: Thomas Gilovich
2020: Dale Miller

See also

 List of psychology awards

References

American psychology awards
Awards established in 1980